TransJakarta (stylised as transjakarta, often erroneously called Busway) is a bus rapid transit (BRT) system in Jakarta, Indonesia. The first BRT system in Southeast Asia, it commenced operations on 15 January 2004 to provide a fast public transport system to help reduce rush hour traffic. The system is considered as the first revolutionary public transit mode in the capital city of Indonesia. The buses run in dedicated lanes (busways), and ticket prices are subsidised by the regional government. TransJakarta has the world's longest BRT system (251.2 km in length), which operates about 4,300 buses. As of February 2020, it serves an average of 1.006 million passengers daily.

TransJakarta system is operated by municipally-owned company PT Transportasi Jakarta. However, most of its fleet is operated by various companies aside of the company itself.

History and development 

TransJakarta was conceived to provide a fast, comfortable, and affordable mass transportation system. To accomplish those objectives, the buses were given lanes restricted to other traffic and separated by concrete blocks on the streets that became part of the busway routes. The first TransJakarta line opened to the public on 15 January 2004. It was free for the first two weeks, after which commercial operations started on 1February 2004.

At present, TransJakarta has 13 primary routes and ten cross-corridor routes. In addition, there are about 200 "feeder" routes that serve beyond the exclusive busway corridors to serve satellite cities in Greater Jakarta. The number of TransJakarta buses has also increased dramatically, from 605 buses in 2015 to 4,300 in 2020. The fare has remained Rp 3,500 (27 US cents) per passenger since operations began. The service set a record in 2018 when it carried 730,000 passengers per day, a significant jump from 331,000 per day in 2015. About 189.8 million passengers used TransJakarta in 2018 and targeted to serve one million passengers daily. In November 2020, TransJakarta won the 2021 Sustainable Transport Award.

As of September 2019, TransJakarta is currently testing electric buses, with Bundaran SenayanMonas as its first route. TransJakarta has undertaken an ambitious plan to expand its electric bus (e-bus) fleet to 10,000 units over the decade.

Operations 

During the Transitional LSSR, TransJakarta publicly operates from 5:00 am to 10:00 pm. A special service for medical staff is available from 10:00 pm to 11:00 pm.

Characteristics 

The characteristics of TransJakarta listed in an Asian Development Bank study are:
 Closed Trunk System without a Feeder System
 Elevated Platform for Rapid Boarding and Alighting
 Public Sector Bus Procurement and Private Sector Bus Operation
 Operating at 450,000 passengers/day (2016)

Routes 

15 corridors were initially planned, 13 of which are currently operational. Corridors 1 until 12 operates at a ground level, separated from mixed traffic by roadblocks. Corridor 13 is the first route to feature a dedicated elevated track. Corridors 14 and 15 are planned to feature grade-separated elevated tracks as well.

Other than the 13 main corridors, TransJakarta operates 33 direct BRT routes, 71 feeder routes (Partially integrated to the BRT system), 13 suburban routes to satellite cities, 22 routes serving low-cost apartments, 70 micro bus routes and 13 Royal Trans routes.

Timeline of routes 

 15 January 2004: Corridor 1, (Blok M to Kota) (soft launch)
 1 February 2004: Corridor 1, (Blok M to Kota) (commercial service)
 15 January 2006: Corridor 2, (Pulo Gadung to Harmoni) and Corridor 3, (Kalideres to Pasar Baru) became operational.
 27 January 2007: Corridor 4, (Pulo Gadung to Dukuh Atas 2), Corridor 5, (Kp. Melayu to Ancol), Corridor 6, (Halimun to Ragunan) and Corridor 7, (Kampung Rambutan to Kampung Melayu) became operational.
 21 February 2009: Corridor 8, (Lebak Bulus to Harmoni) became operational.
 31 December 2010: Corridor 9, (Pluit to Pinang Ranti) and Corridor 10, (PGC Cililitan to Tanjung Priok) became operational.
 18 March 2011: Corridor 9 was the only corridor serving until 11.00pm. Followed by Corridor1, with transit point with Corridor9 at Semanggi shelter. The night service, however, stops only at certain shelters.
 20 May 2011: Corridor 2 and Corridor 3 initialised to serve until 11.00pm, but only open nine shelters out of 22 on Corridor2 and9 out of 13 shelters on Corridor3 remain open during the extended hours.
 1 July 2011: Corridors 4 to 7 began their late night-service, leaving only Corridor8 without a late-night service.
 28 September 2011: Three feeder bus routes launched with Route1 from West Jakarta Municipal Office to Daan Mogot, Route2 from Tanah Abang to Medan Merdeka Selatan and Route3 from SCBD to Senayan. The fare will be Rp.6,500 ($0.72), which cover tickets both for the feeder service and for TransJakarta buses. However, the feeder routes were eventually shut down because of the low number of riders.
 13 December 2011: TransJakarta implemented a policy of segregating male and female passengers, following the example set by the commuter rail network. The designated women-only areas have been established between the middle door and driver cabins.
 28 December 2011: Corridor 11 (Kp. Melayu to Pulo Gebang) became operational.
 14 February 2013: Corridor 12 (Pluit to Tanjung Priok) became operational.
 19 May 2014: The extension of Corridor 2 (Pulo Gadung to Harapan Indah) became operational.
 16 August 2017: Corridor 13 (Ciledug to Tendean) became operational.

On 1 June 2014, a 24-hour operation began on three corridorsthe Blok M-Kota route (Corridor1), Pinang Ranti-Pluit route (Corridor9) and Kalideres-Pasar Baru route (Corridor3). Service is provided by 18 buses with two buses in reserve and the service frequency is between thirty minutes and an hour. On 6 May 2015, 24-hour operation began on four corridorsthe Harmoni-Pulogadung route (Corridor2), Cililitan-Ancol Route (Corridor5), Harmoni-Lebak Bulus route (corridor8) and Tanjung Priok-Cililitan route (corridor 10). Service is provided by 28 buses with two buses in reserve and a 30- to 60-minute frequency.

Fleet

Current fleet 
Each bus is constructed with passenger safety in mind. For example, the body frame is constructed using Galvanyl (Zn–Fe Alloy), a strong and rust-resistant metal. There are also eight or ten glass-shattering hammers mounted on some of the window frames, and three emergency doors for fast evacuation during an emergency. There are also two fire extinguishers at the front and back of the buses.

A typical TransJakarta bus is painted with blue and white livery with the TransJakarta logo. A;; TransJakarta buses was previously mandated to use compressed natural gas (CNG) and prohibited from using diesel fuel, but regulations have since been revised to permit diesel-powered buses once again due to efficiency issues and a shortage of CNG refueling stations. To facilitate passenger ingress and egress, buses are outfitted with two doors on either side, while a partition segregates the driver from passengers to enable the former to focus more intently on operating the vehicle.

The capacity of each bus varies from 85, 100 to 120 passengers. Single Mercedes-Benz and Hino buses can carry about 85 passengers. Scania, Mercedes-Benz and Volvo Maxi buses can carry 100 passengers, and 120 can be carried by a standard articulated bus. TransJakarta operates Chinese-made Yutong, Zhongtong & Ankai and Swedish-made Scania articulated buses on long and straight corridors.

Passengers can only board TransJakarta buses from designated shelters due to the higher passenger doors equipped with automated swing and slide mechanisms, which are controlled by the driver; however, the slide mechanism is being replaced by swing doors on all new buses, and full-height acrylic glass barriers are installed near the sliding doors, while low street-level doors are used for feeder routes with a driver's door on the front-left side of the bus for big buses and a pair of hydraulic folding doors for medium buses.

TransJakarta buses have electronic boards and speakers that announce the name of shelters in Indonesian and English, bi-directional radio transceivers for communication between drivers and control centers, at least four mandatory CCTV cameras per bus, and automatic air freshener dispensers to keep the air fresh during rush hours.

TransJakarta offers Royal Trans as a premium service, which provides passengers with premium seating, extra comfort, free Wi-Fi, USB charging ports, an onboard entertainment TV, and no standing allowed. Payment is made through electronic tapping equipment onboard the buses, and the service is not integrated into the main BRT system. TransJakarta also operates Metro Trans, which uses low entry buses and is not integrated with the BRT service, but integration is possible at terminals such as Blok M and Pasar Kebayoran Lama.

In order to promote gender equality, TransJakarta is aiming to recruit more female drivers, targeting 30% of the total. As of 21 April 2016, TransJakarta introduced female-only buses for Corridor 1, which are operated by female drivers and onboard officers and painted pink to differentiate them from regular buses. Some routes also offer disabled-friendly buses, with plans to acquire an additional 300 such buses by 2017 to serve 15-20 routes.

 PT Transportasi Jakarta (self-managed)  Scania K340IA CNG Euro VI, Scania K320IA CNG Euro VI, Mercedes Benz OH1526 NG M/T, Mercedes Benz OC 500 RF 2542, Mercedes Benz OH1626 A/T, Mercedes Benz OH1626 M/T, Hino RK1 JSNL-RHJ CNG Euro IV, Mercedes-Benz O500U 1726 and Scania K250UB 4x2 Euro III as Metro Trans, Mercedes-Benz OF 917 RF as Royal Trans
 Perum PPD (Pengangkutan Penumpang Djakarta)  Hino RK8JSKA-NHJ R260, Zhongtong LCK6180GC Doosan CNG Euro V
 PT. Mayasari Bakti  Scania K320IA CNG Euro VI, Scania K310IB 6x2, Mercedes-Benz OH1626 A/T, BYD K9
 Trans Swadaya  Mitsubishi FE 84G BC as Mini Trans
 PT. Pahala Kencana  Mercedes-Benz OH1626 M/T
 PT. Steady Safe Tbk  Volvo B11R
 PT. Bianglala Metropolitan  Hino RK8JSKA-NHJ R260 as AMARI/ANDINI (Night Bus) (in cooperation with DAMRI and PPD), Mercedes-Benz OH1626 A/T
 Koantas Bima (Koperasi Angkutan Lintas Bis Madya)  Hino FB 130 as Mini Trans
 PT. Bayu Holong Persada  Hino RN8JSKA-SJJ R285

Future fleet 

 PT. Mayasari Bakti Scania K250IB 4x2 Euro III
 Kopami Jaya (Koperasi Pengemudi Angkutan Mikrobus DKI Jakarta)  Isuzu NQR71 as Mini Trans
 PT. Metro Mini  Isuzu NQR71 as Mini Trans
 Kopaja (Koperasi Angkutan Jakarta)  Mitsubishi FE 84G BC as Mini Trans
 Kendaraan Listrik - Electric Vehicle  MAB MD12E NF Electric bus, BYD K9 Electric bus, BYD C6, Zhongtong LCK6126EVGRA1, Skywell NJL6126BEV, Higer Azure KLQ6125GEV, and E-Inobus

Note :TransJakarta stated that it will not buy any electric buses. Instead, electric buses will be operated by operators under the Rupiah-per-kilometer scheme. Currently all electric bus models listed is either under trial or is to commence trial in the near future.

Retired fleet 

The Mercedes-Benz OH and Hino RG air-conditioned buses operated in Corridor1 are painted red and yellow, with a picture of a young brahminy kite, which looks similar to a bald eagle grasping a tree branch with three salaks on it. The buses use special fuel which is (a mix of diesel and biodiesel). For Corridors2 (bus colours: blue and white) and3 (bus colours: yellow and red), the buses are CNG-fueled Daewoo buses imported from South Korea. Corridors 4, 5 and6 used Grey Daewoo and Hyundai CNG buses, with Komodo and Huanghai articulated buses dedicated for Corridor5. Grey Hino CNG buses are used for Corridors7 and 8. Corridors9 and10 used Red coloured Hyundai and Komodo articulated buses, whilst Corridor 11 uses red Inobus articulated buses. Corridor 12 used to use red coloured Ankai and Inobus buses as well. Due to various coach builders being involved and design tweaks applied over time, the exterior and interior appearance, quality, and comfort varies between buses operating in the same corridor. Seats in old buses face the aisle to optimise passengers' movement during rush hours. Older buses were equipped with folding or hydraulic sliding doors, while newer units were equipped with swing doors.

In August 2011, TransJakarta operator installed cameras on one bus for a trial period. The plan is to install four cameras on each bus gradually in efforts to improve services such as to inform passengers waiting for buses about how crowded approaching buses are, and to prevent sexual harassment.

 PT. Jakarta Express Trans  Hino RG J08C-TI and Mercedes-Benz OH1521 Intercooler OM366LA
 PT. Trans Batavia  Daewoo BH115E Doosan Infracore GE12TI and Hino RK1 JSNL-RHJ CNG Euro IV
 PT. Jakarta Mega Trans  Daewoo BH115E Doosan Infracore GE12TI, Hyundai Aero-Hi Class C6AC, Huanghai DD6181S01 Cummins ISL G 320 and AAI Komodo Doosan Infracore GE12TI
 PT. Jakarta Trans Metropolitan  Daewoo BH115E Doosan Infracore GE12TI, Hyundai Aero-Hi Class C6AC and Hino RK8JSKA-NHJ R260
 PT. Eka Sari Lorena  Hino RK1 JSNL-RHJ CNG Euro IV and AAI Komodo Doosan Infracore GE12TI
 PT. Primajasa Perdanarayautama  Hino RK1 JSNL-RHJ CNG Euro IV
 PT. Bianglala Metropolitan  Hyundai Aero Class C6AC, AAI Komodo Doosan Infracore GE12TI, INKA Inobus Cummins ATC 320 CNG Series Euro V, Ankai HFF6180G02D Weichai CNG Euro IV, Hino RG J08C-TI and Mercedes-Benz OH1521 Intercooler OM366LA
 PT. Trans Mayapada Busway  Hyundai Aero Class C6AC and AAI Komodo Doosan Infracore GE12TI
 Perum DAMRI  INKA Inobus Cummins ATC 320 CNG Series Euro V and Zhongtong LCK6180GC Doosan CNG Euro V
 PT Transportasi Jakarta (self-managed)  Yutong ZK6180HGC Weichai CNG Euro III, Ankai HFF6180G02D Weichai CNG Euro IV, Hino RK8JSKA-NHJ R260, Zhongtong Bus LCK6180GC Doosan CNG Euro V
 Kopaja (Koperasi Angkutan Jakarta)  Toyota Dyna 110FT, Isuzu NQR 71, Isuzu FRR 90
Reference:

Shelters 

TransJakarta shelters are distinguished from typical bus stops as they are often located in the middle of the road and require passengers to access them via elevated bridges. Some of the stops are equipped with escalators or lifts, and are designed to be seamlessly integrated into nearby buildings. For instance, the Tosari ICBC stop used to be directly connected to the UOB Plaza, but has since been replaced with a road crossing. Similarly, the Blok M stop provides stair access to the nearby Blok M Mall.

TransJakarta shelters are primarily constructed using aluminium, steel, and glass materials. To ensure proper air ventilation, fins are installed on the aluminium parts of the shelters. Although the floors of the shelters are usually made of tread plates, newer shelters are now built with concrete materials. The shelters may feature platform screen doors to ensure passenger safety.

Some of the elevated bridge ramps connecting the shelters have gentle slopes to accommodate disabled passengers, although some require passengers to walk a relatively long way up the ramps before doubling back to reach the boarding shelters. The floors of the bridges are typically made of tread plates, although some use concrete. However, noise is a problem for tread plates due to the movement of passengers, and some tread plates may become slippery during the rainy season. Most of the shelters lack sanitary facilities.

Initially, bus stops are open from 05:00am to 10:00pm although opening hours can be extended if there are passengers still waiting at closing time. Since midnight bus services are launched, a number of shelters start to operate 24 hours a day. Currently all bus stops serves round-the-clock. Shelters often become extremely overcrowded because of long and sometimes unpredictable intervals between buses. According to a report from the Indonesian Consumers Protection Foundation in 2011, the most common complaint from passengers about the service offered by Transjakarta was the long wait times for buses at some of the main shelters.

The large Harmoni Central Busway (HCB) shelter on Jalan Gadjah Mada, Central Jakarta, is built over the Ciliwung River. It is a transit point between Corridors 1, 2, 3, 5C, 5H, 7F, 8, 8A, 9B and 10H. This 500-person shelter has 18 bus bays. Although many trees had to be sacrificed during the construction of it, an old banyan tree was not chopped down because it was considered rich in historical value. However, in October 2006 this tree was vandalised by people from the Pemuda Persatuan Islam religious group. Their motive was to show that the tree does not possess supernatural qualities.

Since April 15, 2022, 11 bus shelters are revitalized to improve passenger service, create more public spaces for tourism, and accelerate integration with other public transportation services.

Ticketing and fares 

The cost of a TransJakarta ticket since its opening has been a flat rate of Rp 2.000,- at concessional times (05.00 a.m. to 07.00 a.m.) and Rp 3.500,- (about 24 US cents) at all other times. Passengers who wish to change direction or transit to other corridors do not need to pay again, provided they do not exit the shelter. An exception is in effect at the line terminus.

Up to 2015, passengers could purchase a single-journey paper ticket at the ticket booth in the shelter. In 2013, TransJakarta introduced the use of prepaid cards or e-tickets from BRI BRizzi, BCA Flazz, BNI Tapcash, Mandiri E-Money, Bank DKI JakCard, and Bank Mega MegaCash. The prepaid cards can be purchased and topped-up at any ticket booth in the shelter throughout the system, or the ATM of the issuing bank. The e-ticket is priced at Rp 40,000, Rp 20,000 for the card itself and a balance of Rp 20,000. The prepaid cards, except for Bank DKI JakCard and Bank Mega MegaCash, are also valid as a ticket in the Jabodetabek Commuter Train system as of June 2014, easing the integration plan between the BRT and the commuter train system. In April and May 2014, the TransJakarta management started compulsory use of e-tickets at several terminus in the system, based on news that the BCA Flazz Card could also be used in Jabodetabek Commuter Train. In mid-October 2014, 56% passengers have used e-tickets. Now, all TransJakarta corridors and shelters applied the compulsory use of the e-tickets, since 21 February 2015. 17 August 2016 marks the start of tap-out system trial in Corridor1 (Blok M – Kota), while a similar trial was started on 9September 2016 in Corridor2. The system is meant to control the flow of people going in and out of the shelters, discourage illegal entrance to and exit from the shelters, and to encourage sales and usage of the "e-tickets". In October 2016, the system had been implemented in all corridors of TransJakarta.

Starting on 24 August 2015 students who have the Jakarta Smart Card (Kartu Jakarta Pintar, KJP) can use it as an e-ticket for a free bus ride. The TJ Card, introduced in January 2018, provides free fares for their holders and is available for seniors above 60, residents of the Thousand Islands Regency, disabled persons, low-income households, teachers, mosquito controllers and mosque caretakers in addition to members of the Indonesian National Armed Forces and the Police.

In feeder routes, passengers can pay cash to the bus conductor or use a prepaid card issued by a specific bank. This varies depending on the route (ex: Corridor 6H mainly accepts BCA Flazz cards only, Corridor 3E mainly accepts BNI Tapcash cards only), and is highly unreliable. The card-reading device is sometimes unavailable, or different from the usual bank device issued in one route. This method of payment is currently still in use and is gradually phased out in favor of the Tap-On-Bus (TOB) system. TOB acts similarly to the E-ticket payment system on shelters. It accepts payment from all prepaid bank-issued cards that are eligible on bus shelters. The only difference is that payment is done on board the feeder bus instead of shelters. All buses assigned to routes 1H, 1N, 1R, 4F and 5F already has the TOB installed on it and make use of TOB for all payment.

On 2 October 2020, Transjakarta launched Tije, an app that allows passengers to buy tickets using QR codes. It was launched to reduce COVID-19 transmission by reducing interaction between passengers and ticket offices. The app also allows the users to see bus arrival times.

On 13 October 2021, KAI Commuter starts trialling its Multi Trip Card as a payment card for MRT Jakarta, Transjakarta and LRT Jakarta, as part of efforts integrating Jakarta's public transportation ticketing.

Passengers 
During rush hours, people from upper or middle classes (one of the main targets of TransJakarta) usually prefer to use private cars or taxis to avoid the inconvenience of the overcrowded TransJakarta buses even though they have to bear with traffic jams instead. Many passengers are thus lower-middle-class people who are ex-users of other less comfortable and/or more expensive commercial buses. This situation is at odds with one of the objectives of TransJakarta, which was to reduce traffic jam during rush hours by persuading private car owners to use comfortable public transport.
There is a special program for the student groups called TransJakarta goes to school. Participants in the program are assigned a dedicated bus. The aim is to train students to stand in line, be decent, and prefer public transport than personal vehicles. The municipal government has been trying to encourage the population to shift from their private vehicles to public transportation, especially TransJakarta. Thus, several regulations are put in place to restrict private cars on the street. By August 2018, the odd–even traffic policy increases TransJakarta passengers by 30,000.

Accidents and incidents 

Several design and operational problems have been identified. Despite having an exclusive bus lane, unauthorised vehicles illegally using the lanes in an attempt to more quickly navigate through the traffic jams are commonplace. Depot maintenance shops and special gas stations (most buses use compressed natural gas (CNG)) often have long lines of buses, restricting the availability of buses for service. The CNG powered buses also have suffered from higher fuel consumption than expected (one litre for 1.3 km compared to 2.1 km as specified) and high oil and moisture content requiring extra maintenance. Other problems identified were: a lack of feeder bus services, a lack of adequate transfer information and transfer facilities and a lack of articulated buses. A 2010 survey showed 75% of passengers transferred from medium or micro-buses to the TransJakarta buses, and it was estimated if direct service operations were implemented (i.e., multiple stopping points at some stations with bypass lanes and some services continuing beyond the trunk corridors) patronage would increase by 50%. A feeder bus service called APTB was introduced in 2012.

In May 2013, it was reported that the system was losing passengers due to unpredictable service frequency, worsening travel times, and poor maintenance of the infrastructure and vehicles. The problem of excluding private vehicles from busways was still ongoing. By November 2013, after a campaign to "sterilise" the lanes improved travel times, reports indicate patronage had increased by 20,000 per day up to between 330,000 and 355,000.

From January to July 2010, there were 237 accidents involving TransJakarta buses, resulting in 57 injuries and eight deaths. Accidents occurred due to pedestrians crossing the busway and cars making U-turns. In 2011, in an effort to stop non-TransJakarta vehicles using the bus lanes, the Jakarta Police Chief suggested that TransJakarta buses should run against the direction of traffic flow. Usually, non-TransJakarta vehicles used the busway lanes during rush hours.

On 12 January 2012, a policeman from the Indonesian Police Headquarters, who was hired by Securicor, fired his gun near the ear of a TransJakarta officer after threatening to kill him. The policeman was angry after the TransJakarta officer stopped the Securicor car from entering the busway lane, which allows only TransJakarta buses, ambulances, and firefighters to enter. The police spokesman said that the policeman would be charged by criminal law or disciplinary sanction.

Hijacking 

On 12 March 2012, four TransJakarta buses were hijacked by alleged university students at the Medan Merdeka Selatan street. The buses were driven to the front of the Universitas Kristen Indonesia (Christian University of Indonesia) campus. Three drivers were able to escape from their buses, but one driver was prevented from leaving and forced to drive the hijackers to their destination. Fire extinguishers, glass-breaking hammers and drivers' jackets were also stolen from the buses.

2013 corruption case 

In 2014, a corruption investigation began over series of accidents related to poor conditions of new vehicles through fraudulent procurement of more than one trillion IDR. The probe indicted Head of Jakarta Transport Department Udar Pristono as suspect of the corruption case. Pristono argued that he was only working under the supervision of then governor Joko Widodo on the procurement project, and accusing him liable for the legal prosecution as he had the responsibility over financial budget abuses involved in his administration.

Bombing 

On 24 May 2017, a twin bomb attack struck the Kampung Melayu Transjakarta bus terminal. The first explosion happened at nine sharp, near the terminal's toilet, and the second explosion happened five minutes after at the bus stop. In total, five people were killed, including the two suspects.

Sexual harassment 

A number of sexual harassment cases have been reported on board crammed TransJakarta buses and their overcrowded stations over the past few years, as the number of passengers has continued to rise. TransJakarta responded by providing a women-only area at the front of its buses and launching women-only buses.

Burning incident 

Demonstrations opposing a bill draft in October 2020 turned violent and multiple bus stops became targets. The stations of Bundaran HI and Sarinah were the first two shelters burned down, out of a total of 20 shelters that were either entirely or partially burned, looted, damaged and vandalised by rioters. TransJakarta claimed a loss of up to 55 billion Rupiah.

Rear-end collision 
There has been cases where fellow Transjakarta buses collided in the Transjakarta lane. In 2016, Kopaja AC buses (under pilot integration program with Transjakarta) collided with Corridor 1 bus at Monas station triggering a chain collision and 2 fatal injuries. In October 2021, two buses serving Corridor 9 were involved in a similar accident, leaving 3 casualties.

Transit Oriented Development 

Seventeen Transit Oriented Development (TOD) is being built to integrate of multiple transport systems to facilitate easy and convenient transit between various mode of public transportation. At Tebet, the TOD integrates TransJakarta and the Commuter Line. Meanwhile, at Dukuh Atas TOD (Indonesian: Kawasan Integrasi Dukuh Atas or KIDA), the aim is to prioritise walking and the use of public transport as a commuting solution, rather than using private vehicles. KIDA will integrate seven transport systems in total, which are the Jakarta MRT, Jabodebek LRT, Jakarta LRT, Soekarno-Hatta Airport Rail Link, Commuter Line, TransJakarta, and other bus services.

As of July 2019, there are about 1,170 Angkot micro-buses integrated with different routes of Transjakarta, which is expected to increase 1500 by the end of the year.

Logos

See also 

 Kopaja
 MetroMini
 Transport in Jakarta
 Transport in Indonesia
 TransMilenio
 Metrobus (Lahore)
 Metrobus (Istanbul)
 Rapid KL BRT Sunway Line

References

External links 

  
  Transjakarta Community Site
  Transjakarta map
  Transjakarta Guide for Blackberry (Download)
  Interactive Transjakarta Map and Shelters Info

Jakarta
Transport companies established in 2004
Transport in Jakarta
2004 establishments in Indonesia
Transport infrastructure completed in 2004
 
Regionally-owned companies of Indonesia